This is a list of mass media in Costa Rica.

Costa Rica is ranked fifth in the World Press Freedom Index (2021 edition). This ranking is prepared by the organization Reporters Without Borders (RSF), and was published on April 20, 2021. In addition, at a continental level, it is in first place among the American countries. In previous years, the country has been ranked number 10 in the 2019 edition; while in 2020 it reached seventh place. Therefore, there has been an improvement in the country's situation regarding freedom of the press in recent years, showing a growth rate.

Television news 

Noticias Repretel, Canal 6
Telenoticias, Canal 7
NC 11, Canal 11
Telediario, Canal 8
Extra Noticias 42, Canal 42
Anexión TV, Canal 36
Costa Rica Traveler Magazine
Noticias Telenorte, Canal 14
El Heraldo TV, canal 44

Newspapers 

La Gaceta  Government Official Newspaper
La Nación
La República
The Costa Rica News (English).
Diario Extra
Al Día
La Prensa Libre
El Financiero Weekly
Semanario Universidad Weekly
The Tico Time (English).
Tiempos del Mundo Weekly. Hemispheric Edition

Magazines 
Revista Perfil  
EKA
Actualidad Económica
Apetito
Costa Rica Guest Magazine
Costa Rica Real Estate Guide
Summa
Where In Costa Rica
Casa Galeria

Radio 

Radio U
Beatz106

Internet
 CRHoy 
 Ameliarueda 
 Costa Rica Business News
 Costa Rica Star
 InformaTico
 El Pregon
 Futbol Costa Rica
 Q Costa Rica

References